Devin Dawson Durrett (born January 30, 1989) is an American country music singer and songwriter. He became known after filming a mashup of Taylor Swift songs with his fellow friend Louisa Wendorff on her YouTube channel, which gained popularity on YouTube. His debut single "All on Me" is also his first hit song. With the help of producer Jay Joyce, he signed to Warner Bros. Records in 2017. Dawson's "All on Me" has charted on the Hot Country Songs and Country Airplay charts.

Dawson was born in Orangevale, California. Before launching his solo career, he was the bass player for the deathcore band Shadow of the Colossus.

Dawson has also toured with Brett Eldredge, Tim McGraw and Faith Hill.

Dawson's debut album Dark Horse was released on January 19, 2018.

Dawson's band includes Austin Taylor Smith (guitar, vocals), Nick DiMaria (lead guitar), Sam  Rodberg (bass guitar), and Kip Allen (drums).

Discography

Studio albums

Extended plays

Singles

As a featured artist

Music videos

Awards and nominations

References

External links
 

1989 births
Living people
American country singer-songwriters
Warner Records artists
People from Sacramento County, California
Country musicians from California
American male singer-songwriters
Singer-songwriters from California
21st-century American singers
21st-century American male singers